Shanghai National Police Database (or SHGA Database) are leaked data of personal information of Chinese residents and police cases, publicly sold by a unknown hacker on the Internet at the price of  10 bitcoins. The data are allegedly leaked from the Shanghai Public Security Bureau, consisting of multiple parts totaling more than 23 terabytes, involving more than one billion mainland Chinese residents, including names, addresses, places of birth, resident ID card numbers, phone numbers, photos, mobile phone numbers and information of criminal cases. Screenshots circulated on the Internet reveals that the data provides a huge amount of detailed police information, including the time of reporting criminals, the phone number of the reporting person and the reasons for reporting. Preliminary analysis of the data samples showed that the personal information in the database came from residents across mainland China, not just Shanghai.

Media suggests that it would be the largest while unprecedented data leak incident since 1949, if the amount of data is accurate. It is reported that Weibo, a social platform in mainland China, has applied censorship on some keywords to stop the news from spreading. The authority have yet to confirm or publicly respond to the incident. Bloomberg faxed inquiries to the Central Cyberspace Administration of China and the Shanghai Police Bureau while no responses are received yet. Bloomberg criticized that data breaches within the People's Republic of China are rarely disclosed and lack transparency, mentioning several data leakage incidents in mainland China in the past few years, such as the leakage of personal information of Communist Party members in 2016, the leakage of Weibo account information in 2020, and the information leakage of Xinjiang re-education camps in 2022. The leak was initially discovered by cybersecurity researcher, Vinny Troia, over a full year prior to the server being closed.

See also 

 Data breach
 Mass surveillance in China
 Health Code#Surveillance and invasion of privacy
 Xinjiang Police Files
 List of data breaches

Sources 

2022 in China
Data breaches
Cyberattacks